Stephan Seiter (born 18 March 1963) is a German economist and politician of the Free Democratic Party (FDP) who has been serving as a member of the Bundestag from the state of Baden-Württemberg since 2021.

Early life and career
Seiter studied economics at the University of Hohenheim from 1984 to 1989. He subsequently During that time, he also was the Theodor Heuss Lecturer at the New School for Social Research in 2000. From 2007, Seiter was a professor of economics at Reutlingen University’s ESB Business School.

Political career
Seiter entered the FDP in 2016.

Seiter became a member of the Bundestag in the 2021 elections, representing the Waiblingen district. 

In parliament, Seiter has since been serving on the Committee on Education, Research and Technology Assessment and the Committee on Labour and Social Affairs. Since June 2022, he has been his parliamentary group’s spokesperson for research, technology and innovation.

In addition to his committee assignments, Seiter is part of the German-Greek Parliamentary Friendship Group.

Other activities
 University of Hagen, Member of the Parliamentary Advisory Board (since 2022)
 American Economic Association (AEA), Member
 VfB Stuttgart, Member

References 

Living people
1963 births
Politicians from Stuttgart
Free Democratic Party (Germany) politicians
21st-century German politicians
Members of the Bundestag 2021–2025